The 2021 season is Hougang United's 24th consecutive season in the top flight of Singapore football and in the S.League. Along with the S.League, the club will also compete in the Singapore Cup.

Squad

Singapore Premier League

U21 Squad

Tiong Bahru FC
(Chairman, Bill Ng is also the chairman for the club)

Coaching staff

Transfers

In

Pre-season

Mid-season

Loan Return 
Pre-season

Note 1: Zulfahmi Arifin loan to Suphanburi was cancelled before moving to Samut Prakan City on loan.

Note 2: Harhys Stewart loan to Young Lions was extended for another season.

Note 3: Sahffee Jubpre loan to Young Lions was extended for another season.

Note 4: Asraf Zahid left the club after returning to the club.

Mid-season

Note 1: Zulfahmi Arifin loan to Samut Prakan City was terminated before the agreed date, May 2022.

Out
Pre-season

Note 1: Zulfahmi Arifin loan to Suphanburi was cancelled before moving to Samut Prakan City on loan till May 2022 .

Mid-season

Loan out
Pre-season

Mid-season

Retained / Extension

Friendlies

Pre-Season Friendly

Mid-season friendlies

Team statistics

Appearances and goals

Competitions

Overview

Singapore Premier League

Singapore Cup

See also 
 2014 Hougang United FC season
 2015 Hougang United FC season
 2016 Hougang United FC season
 2017 Hougang United FC season
 2018 Hougang United FC season
 2019 Hougang United FC season
 2020 Hougang United FC season

Notes

References 

Hougang United FC
Hougang United FC seasons